Laxmi Narayan Sudhanshu (1906–1974) was an Indian writer, litterateur, poet, independent activist and political leader. He won the 1952 Bihar Legislative Assembly election from an assembly seat in Purnia. He also held the post of Speaker of the Bihar Legislative Assembly from 1962 to 1967. Sudhanshu is known for actively participating in the Quit India Movement in 1942. He was imprisoned in Bhagalpur jail by the Britishers.

Biography 
Lakshmi Narayan Sudhanshu was born on 15 December 1906 in Rupaspur village, located in Dhamdaha sub-division of Purnia district. In 1934, he did MA in Hindi from Kashi University. In 1962, he earned a degree of D. Litt from Bhagalpur University. 

His first published novel was 'Matriprem'. He was elected an MLA in 1952 after winning an assembly seat in Purnia. In 1962, he was elected unopposed as the Speaker of the Bihar Vidhan Sabha and held the position from 15 March 1962 to 15 March 1967. He also played an active role in the freedom struggle movement. In 1955, he established Kala Bhavan to promote literature, art and culture in Purnia. He died in Patna, Bihar, on 7 April 1974.

From 1935 to 1938, he was the headmaster of Govardhan Sahitya Vidyalaya, Deoghar. At the same time, he was the editor of a quarterly magazine, 'Sahitya'. He was also the editor of the weekly newspaper 'Rashtra-Sandesh' of Purnia district and Patna's monthly magazine 'Avantika'. He served as the President of the Hindi Pragati Samiti, established by the Bihar government. In 1939-40, he was the President of the Purnia District Board. In 1950, he was nominated as the President of the Bihar Pradesh Congress Committee. He is one of the founders of the Bihar Rashtrabhasha Parishad and was also a lifelong member of its board of directors. He started his literary career during his student life itself. He published a novel titled 'Bhatruprem' in 1926,  followed by 'Gulab Ki Kaliyan' in 1928 and 'Rasrang' in 1929.

A biography book, 'Laxminarayan Sudhanshu Vyaktitva Aur Kratitiva' (Laxminarayan Sudhanshu Personality and Works), was published in 2009 and written by Vanshidhar Singh. The Government of Bihar State has constituted an award after him, called Laxmi Narayan Sudhanshu Prize, which is given to scholars who published Research papers related to the Hindi language and literature.

Books 
 Matriprem
 Kavya Me Abhivyanjanavad 
 Jeewan Ke Tattv Aur Kavya Ke Siddhant
 Hindi Sahitya Ka Brihat Itihas, Nagari Pracharini Sabha, Kashi
 Pracheen Bharatiya Arya Raj Vans
 Avantika (as magazine editor)
 'Bhatruprem Gulab Ki Kaliyan Rasrang''

See also 
 List of speakers of the Bihar Legislative Assembly

References 

1906 births
1974 deaths
Speakers of the Bihar Legislative Assembly
Bihar MLAs 1952–1957
Indian National Congress politicians
People from Bihar
Hindi-language writers
Indian male novelists
Indian independence activists from Bihar
People from Purnia district
20th-century Indian novelists
Novelists from Bihar
20th-century Indian male writers